Bionic Commando, released in Japan as  is a run and gun platform game released by Capcom in arcades in 1987. It was designed by Tokuro Fujiwara as a successor to his earlier "wire action" platformer Roc'n Rope (1983), building on its grappling hook mechanic; he was also the designer of Commando (1985). The music was composed by Harumi Fujita for the Yamaha YM2151 sound chip.

The game was advertised in the United States as a sequel to Commando, going as far to refer to the game's main character as Super Joe (the protagonist of Commando) in the promotional brochure, who was originally an unnamed member of a "special commando unit" in the Japanese and international versions.

The protagonist is a commando equipped with a bionic arm featuring a grappling gun, allowing him to pull himself forward or swing from the ceiling. Despite being a platform game, the player cannot jump. To cross gaps or climb ledges, the hero must use the bionic arm.

It was later released for several home systems (ported by Software Creations and published by Go!). Capcom later produced a home version for the Nintendo Entertainment System, also titled Bionic Commando, that was drastically different from the arcade game.

Plot 
The story takes place ten years after an unspecified World War between two warring factions. The game follows a commando who must infiltrate an enemy base and foil the enemy's plot to launch missiles. The hero must stop a missile from launching and then fight the final boss, the leader of the enemy forces, guarded by an armed bodyguard.

Gameplay 
The game is presented in a side-scrolling format, with eight-way scrolling. Unlike most platform games, the player is unable to jump, instead navigating the level via the use of a mechanical arm that can pull him up ledges. The arm may also be used to collect pickups.

Prizes like points and power-ups can only be obtained from crates that come on the screen in a parachute, which can be revealed by shooting them. Unlike most of the later games, the player cannot use the arm and shoot at the same time, the arm cannot be used in the air and the only power-ups are weapon enhancements.

Ports 
There are home ports for MS-DOS, Amstrad CPC, Commodore 64, ZX Spectrum, Amiga, and Atari ST. For the Commodore 64, there are two distinct versions: a US version by Capcom, and a UK version by Software Creations. In some versions, there is an additional level between levels 3 and 4, featuring enemy helicopters. The UK home computer versions were published by U.S. Gold.

The music for the ZX Spectrum, Atari ST, Amiga, and Commodore 64 PAL conversion was arranged by Tim Follin, using a music playback engine programmed by Follin's brother.

Reception

In Japan, Game Machine listed Bionic Commando on their April 15, 1987 issue as being the fifth most-successful table arcade unit of the month. U.S. Gold's release for home computers sold 70,000 copies in the United Kingdom by 1989, becoming their best-selling Capcom release up until then.

Home versions generally received average or decent reviews, apart from the ZX Spectrum version which was greeted by some critical praise, receiving ratings of 9/10 and 92% from Your Sinclair and CRASH.

The game was voted Best 8-bit Soundtrack of the Year at the Golden Joystick Awards.

Legacy
The world record high score for Bionic Commando was set in October 2007 by Rudy Chavez of Los Angeles, California. Chavez scored 2,251,090 points.

An emulation of the arcade version is included in Capcom Classics Collection Vol. 1 for PlayStation 2 and Xbox; and Capcom Classics Collection Remixed for PlayStation Portable.

See also 
 Bionic Commando, the series

References 

1987 video games
Amiga games
Amstrad CPC games
Arcade video games
Atari ST games
Capcom games
Commodore 64 games
DOS games
Golden Joystick Award winners
Platform games
Side-scrolling video games
ZX Spectrum games
Bionic Commando
Multiplayer and single-player video games
Video games developed in Japan
Video games about cyborgs
Video games scored by Harumi Fujita
Video games scored by Tim Follin

sv:Bionic Commando